"Cherokee Maiden" is a Western swing love song written by Cindy Walker.  "Cherokee Maiden" was one of Walker's first hits when it was recorded by Bob Wills and The Texas Playboys in 1941 (OKeh 6568).

Background
The title comes from a refrain in the chorus:

Merle Haggard cover

Merle Haggard and The Strangers recorded "Cherokee Maiden" in 1976 (Capitol 4326). It spent 11 weeks on the charts, reaching number one.

Personnel
Merle Haggard– vocals, guitar

The Strangers:
Roy Nichols – lead guitar
Norman Hamlet – steel guitar, dobro
 Tiny Moore – mandolin
Eldon Shamblin– guitar
 Ronnie Reno – guitar
 Mark Yeary – piano
 James Tittle – bass
Biff Adam – drums
Don Markham – saxophone

Chart history

Other Cover Versions
 In 2001, a recording by Asleep At The Wheel earned the group a Grammy.

References

Bibliography
Whitburn, Joel. The Billboard Book of Top 40 Country Hits. Billboard Books, 2006. 

1941 songs
1976 singles
Asleep at the Wheel songs
Merle Haggard songs
Western swing songs
Songs written by Cindy Walker
Song recordings produced by Ken Nelson (American record producer)
Capitol Records singles